Hua Tou (話頭, Korean: hwadu, Japanese: wato) is part of a form of Buddhist meditation known as Gongfu 工夫 (not to be confused with the Martial Arts 功夫 ) common in the teachings of Chan Buddhism, Korean Seon and Rinzai Zen. Hua Tou can be translated as 'word head', 'head of speech' or 'point beyond which speech exhausts itself'. A Hua Tou can be a short phrase that is used as a subject of meditation to focus the mind.

Origins
Hua Tou are based on the encounter-dialogues and koan of the interactions between past masters and students, but are shorter phrases than koans. The Hua Tou method was invented by the Chinese Zen master Dahui Zonggao (1089–1163) who was a member of the Linji school. Dahui was interested in teaching the lay community, particularly the educated Chinese scholar-officials. Support of those "literati" was essential for the survival of the individual lineages, since appointments as abbot of public monasteries were determined by this ruling class. Providing accessible methods of training for layman was a means to gather this necessary support. Hua Tou practice does not use regular interviews and question and answer sessions between student and teacher (dokusan). According to Dahui, Hua Tou is also a form of meditation that "can be carried out by laymen in the midst of their daily activities."

Dahui was also against the intellectualism and literary commentary that had begun to enter into Koan practice with the Blue Cliff Record of his master Yuan-wu. In fact, Dahui burned his copy of the Blue Cliff Record.

Formal Hua Tou practice was promoted in Korea by Seon master Chinul. He was extremely successful in popularizing Hua Tou. According to Robert Buswell: 

According to Bhikkhu Analayo, a similar practice is found in the Pali commentaries relating to mindfulness of bodily postures. Analayo writes that according to the Papañcasudani "the difference between simple walking and walking meditation as a Satipatthana is that a meditator keeps in mind the question: "Who goes? Whose is this going?"  (Ps I 251).

Practice

Dahui emphasised that initial insight is essential for Zen-training. Dahui stressed that it was possible for laymen to achieve enlightenment through this practice. He often gave instructions through letters to his pupils.

Chinul described Hwadu (Hua Tou) in his treatise Dharma Collection and Special Practice Record as a practice that leads to the very limits of speech and acts as a purification device. Because the practice leads students beyond conceptual understanding, Chinul considered an advanced practice for those of particular talent, or those who had already advanced through other practices first.

To practice Hua Tou, one concentrates on the phrase, initially repeating it silently with a questioning and open mind and then thinking about "Who" or "What" is generating the Hua Tou, this brings about "Great Doubt". Hua Tou can be practiced during sitting meditation, after the mind has been calmed through an initial period of breath meditation. 

Hsu Yun said of practicing Hua Tou: 

According to Chan master Sheng Yen, there are three stages of Hua Tou practice: reciting the Hua Tou, asking the Hua Tou and investigating the Hua Tou.  Through these stages it is important not to try to answer the Hua Tou intellectually, but to persistently ask the question mindfully with genuine interest and sincere desire to know.  It is through this constant practice that great doubt and then insight arises.

Examples of Hua Tou
According to Stuart Lachs, there are various popular Hua Tous such as:

“What is it?” -  very popular in Korean Seon
“What is this?”  
“Who is repeating the Buddha’s name?” - Popular with Chinese who also practice nianfo. This Huatou changes nianfo into a Chan practice. 
“Who is dragging this corpse around?” - popularized by Hsu Yun, who often recommended it as a first practice, it was given to him by Master Yang-jing of the Tian-tai sect. 
“Who am I?”
“What was my Original face before my father and mother were born?” - from the Sixth Patriarch Huineng, and the 23rd case in the well known koan collection, the Mumonkan
“What is Mu?” - This is taken from the famous kōan, Joshu’s Mu which goes as follows, “A monk asked Joshu, ‘Does a dog have Buddha-nature or not?’ Joshu replied, ’Mu.”

Notes

References

Sources

Further reading
 Cleary, JC.  Swampland Flowers: The Letters and Lectures of Zen Master Ta Hui (1977) Shambhala.
 Luk, Charles. ‘Empty Cloud The Autobiography of a Chinese Zen Master’ (1988) Element.
 Broughton, Jeffrey. The letters of Chan master Dahui Pujue
 Broughton, Jeffrey. The Chan Whip Anthology: A Companion to Zen Practice

External links
 Hsu Yun Organisation, The Hua Tou practice
 Buddhist Door, Koan or Huatou in Chinese Chan Buddhism
 Yin I. Park, Zen language in our time: the case of Pojo Chinul's Hua Tou practice

Rinzai school
Chan Buddhism
Nondualism